, also known as Tanegashima Airport, is located in Nakatane, on Tanegashima, one of the Ōsumi Islands in southern Kagoshima Prefecture, Japan.

Airlines and destinations

Passenger

References

External links 

 
 

Airports in Kagoshima Prefecture